Rapid casting is an integration of investment casting with rapid prototyping/3D printing. In this technique disposable patterns that are used for forming molds  are  created with 3D printing techniques like fused deposition modeling, stereolithography or any other 3D printing technique.

Advantages 
 Cheap for batch production
 Reduced turnaround time
 Representative prototypes
 Easier to make patterns
 Possibility to make the part lighter by removing unwanted material and stiffer by adding rib features.

Advantages of pressure die casting 
 Cheap at scale
 Large parts
 Good surface finish
 High dimensional accuracy
 High tensile strength

Procedure 
 A disposable pattern is 3D printed (can be of wax or any plastic used in 3D printing PLA,PETG,Etc.).
 The pattern, if made of wax, undergoes wax infiltration and other procedures to increase its strength and dewaxing properties.
 A mold is made by coating the printed pattern using a ceramic slurry.
 The pattern is melted out of the ceramic mold.
 Molten metal is poured into mold.

References 

Casting (manufacturing)
Product design
Industrial processes
3D printing processes
Computer-aided manufacturing
Prototypes
Digital manufacturing